is a Japanese former baseball player.  He finished his career with the Hanshin Tigers of the Central League

References

1967 births
Living people
Japanese baseball players
Nippon Professional Baseball pitchers
Kintetsu Buffaloes players
Hanshin Tigers players
Baseball people from Kyoto